As of 2016, it is estimated that there are 1.5 million adults and children living with HIV/AIDS in North America, excluding Central America and the Caribbean. 70,000 adults and children are newly infected every year, and the overall adult prevalence is 0.5%. 26,000 people in North America (again, excluding Central America and the Caribbean) die from AIDS every year.

HIV/AIDS prevalence rates in North America vary from 0.23% in Mexico to 3.22% in The Bahamas.

HIV/AIDS in Antigua and Barbuda

HIV/AIDS in The Bahamas
As of 2013, the adult prevalence rate is estimated to be 3.22%.

HIV/AIDS in Barbados
As of 2013, the adult prevalence rate is estimated to be 0.88%.

HIV/AIDS in Belize
As of 2014, the adult prevalence rate is estimated to be 1.18%.

HIV/AIDS in Canada
As of 2012, the adult prevalence rate is estimated to be 0.30%.

HIV/AIDS in Costa Rica
As of 2014, the adult prevalence rate is estimated to be 0.26%.

HIV/AIDS in Cuba
As of 2014, the adult prevalence rate is estimated to be 0.25%.

HIV/AIDS in the Dominican Republic
As of 2012, the adult prevalence rate is estimated to be 0.68%.

HIV/AIDS in El Salvador
As of 2012, the adult prevalence rate is estimated to be 0.60%.

HIV/AIDS in Grenada

HIV/AIDS in Guatemala
As of 2012, the adult prevalence rate is estimated to be 0.70%.

HIV/AIDS in Haiti
As of 2014, the adult prevalence rate is estimated to be 1.93%.

HIV/AIDS in Honduras
As of 2012, the adult prevalence rate is estimated to be 0.50%.

HIV/AIDS in Jamaica
As of 2012, the adult prevalence rate is estimated to be 1.70%.

HIV/AIDS in Mexico
As of 2014, the adult prevalence rate is estimated to be 0.23%.

HIV/AIDS in Nicaragua
As of 2012, the adult prevalence rate is estimated to be 0.30%.

HIV/AIDS in Panama
As of 2012, the adult prevalence rate is estimated to be 0.70%.

HIV/AIDS in Saint Kitts and Nevis

HIV/AIDS in Saint Lucia

HIV/AIDS in Saint Vincent and the Grenadines

HIV/AIDS in Trinidad and Tobago
As of 2012, the adult prevalence rate is estimated to be 1.60%.

HIV/AIDS in the United States
As of 2012, the adult prevalence rate is estimated to be 0.60%. African-Americans are at the highest risk  of contracting HIV in the United States. According to the Centers for Disease and Control and Prevention (CDC), African-American accounted for 44% of all new HIV infections in the United States between 2010 and 2016, although African-Americans make up roughly 12% of the American population. The extent of the HIV/AIDS crisis within the African-American community is an indication that the solution will also need to be multi-faceted ranging from increasing access to health care to reducing the stigma that HIV and homosexuality has within the African-American community.

References

See also
 HIV/AIDS in Africa
 HIV/AIDS in Asia
 HIV/AIDS in Europe
 HIV/AIDS in South America
 List of countries by HIV/AIDS adult prevalence rate

 
Health in North America